Isle of the Dead is a children's fantasy book by the English-speaking Australian writer Emily Rodda. It is the third book in the third series of the Deltora series called Dragons of Deltora, also known as Deltora Quest 3 and, in Australia, Deltora III. It was released in 2005. It is published by Scholastic.

Plot
Lief, Barda, and Jasmine have destroyed the Sister of the North and must travel to the Isle of the Dead, the westernmost point of Deltora, to defeat the Sister of the West.

Characters

Lief
Barda
Jasmine

References

External links
Official USA Deltora website
Emily Rodda official website

2004 novels
2004 fantasy novels
Australian children's novels
Australian fantasy novels
Children's fantasy novels
Deltora
2004 children's books
Novels set on fictional islands
Books about dragons